is a passenger railway station located in Midori-ku, Chiba, Japan operated by the East Japan Railway Company (JR East).

Lines
Some Sotobō Line limited express Wakashio services from Tokyo to  stop at this station.

Station layout
This station consists of a single island platform, serving two tracks, with an elevated station building built over the tracks and platforms. The station is staffed.

Platform

History
Toke Station opened on 1 November 1896 as a station on the Bōsō Railway. On 1 September 1907, the Bōsō Railway was nationalized and became part of the Japanese Government Railways, which was transformed into the Japan National Railways (JNR) after World War II. Freight operations were discontinued on 1 October 1962. The station building was enlarged in January 1979, with the construction of the south exit. A new station building was completed in August 1986. The station became part of the JR East network upon privatization of the Japan National Railways (JNR) on 1 April 1987.

Passenger statistics
In fiscal 2019, the station was used by an average of 13,078 passengers daily (boarding passengers only).

Surrounding area
 Chiba Showa-no-mori Park
 Hoki Museum
 Toke High School
 Birds Mall

References

External links

 JR East Station information 

Railway stations in Japan opened in 1896
Railway stations in Chiba Prefecture
Sotobō Line
Railway stations in Chiba (city)